Lisa Picard is Famous, also known as Famous, is a 2000 comedy-drama film directed by Griffin Dunne and written by Nat DeWolf and Laura Kirk. The film stars Kirk, DeWolf, Dunne, Daniel London, and a large number of famous actors in cameos as themselves.

The film's story is about a documentarian who has focused on Lisa Picard as she is on the verge of stardom. It was screened in the Un Certain Regard section at the 2000 Cannes Film Festival.

Cast

References

External links
 
 

2000 films
2000 comedy-drama films
Films directed by Griffin Dunne
American comedy-drama films
2000s English-language films
2000s American films